= Mercilessly Betrayed =

- DVD released by A. Simona Film
- Directed by: A. Simona
- Story by: Mike; A. Simona; Jimmy Tourette
- Starring: Andreas; Mister X Sean Scott; Jean Pallett; Angela Brazil; Nina Cheyenne
- Cinematography: Alex; Sabrina; Jimmy Tourette
- Edited by: A. Simona; Jimmy Tourette
- Production company: A. Simona Film
- Distributed by: A. Simona Film
- Release date: 28 August 2006 (Germany)
- Running time: 100 minutes
- Country: Germany
- Language: German

Mercilessly Betrayed is a 2006 pornographic horror film written and directed by A. Simona, and co-written by Jimmy Tourette and Mike.

== Plot ==
When a bar owner named Schiller tells loan sharks Holt and Rocco he cannot pay back the money he owes them, the two thugs beat and torture him. As he is being assaulted, Schiller offers Holt and Rocco his wife, Anna, in place of money. Taking Schiller up on his offer, Holt and Rocco rape, torture and humiliate Anna in front of Schiller, and leave with her. Despite her injuries, Anna escapes Holt and Rocco's clutches, and swears bloody and brutal revenge on them and Schiller, who has moved on with a new girlfriend.

== Cast ==
- Nina Cheyenne
- Angela Brazil
- Sean Scott
- Andreas
- Jean Pallett
- Mister X

== Release ==
Mercilessly Betrayed had a limited release of 1500 copies in Germany.

== Reception ==
Film Bizarro wrote that Mercilessly Betrayed was lackluster, while Independent Flicks stated that everything about the film was bad, though the website gave it a half star out of ten "for at least trying".
